Laetesia aucklandensis is a species of sheet weaver found in the Auckland Islands. It was described by Forster in 1964.

References

Linyphiidae
Spiders described in 1995
Fauna of the Auckland Islands
Spiders of New Zealand